Olivier Echouafni (born 13 September 1972) is a French former professional footballer. He played as a midfielder for Ligue 1 team OGC Nice, among others.

Coaching career
Echouafni was the manager of Ligue 2 side Sochaux, before being removed from coach office by the club following his poor start to the season.

On 9 September 2016, he was appointed coach of the French women's national football team to replace Philippe Bergeroo.

In 2018 he became manager of Paris Saint-Germain Féminines.

Personal life
Echouafni is of Moroccan descent through his father.

References

External links

1972 births
Living people
People from Menton
French sportspeople of Moroccan descent
Association football midfielders
French footballers
Olympique de Marseille players
RC Strasbourg Alsace players
Stade Rennais F.C. players
OGC Nice players
Ligue 1 players
Ligue 2 players
French football managers
France women's national football team managers
FC Sochaux-Montbéliard managers
Paris Saint-Germain Féminine managers
Sportspeople from Alpes-Maritimes
Footballers from Provence-Alpes-Côte d'Azur